Nadzaladevi is a station on the First Line (Akhmeteli-Varketili Line) of the Tbilisi Metro. It opened on 11 January 1966, when the first section of the metro was put into operation. The station was renovated in 2007.

Gallery

External links
 Nadzaladevi station page at Tbilisi Municipal Portal

Tbilisi Metro stations
Railway stations opened in 1966
1966 establishments in Georgia (country)